In a railway accident, telescoping occurs when the underframe of one vehicle overrides that of another, and smashes through the second vehicle's body. The term is derived from the resulting appearance of the two vehicle bodies: the body of one vehicle may appear to be slid inside the other like the tubes of a collapsible telescope – the body sides, roof and underframe of the latter vehicle being forced apart from each other.

Telescoping often results in heavy fatalities if the cars telescoped are fully occupied.  The car riding on top will often be destroyed by the structure of the car below, crushing those on board (although the physics of the incident may reverse the cars' roles).  The chances of telescoping can be reduced by use of anticlimbers and other structural systems which direct crash energy and debris away from the passenger and crew areas.

Accidents where telescoping occurred are numerous and include:

 1864 Shohola train wreck
 1888 Mud Run disaster
 1928 Times Square derailment
 1945 Michigan train wreck
 1947 Camp Mountain rail accident 
 1952 Harrow and Wealdstone rail crash
 1957 Lewisham rail crash
 1962 Rail accidents in Winsford
 1970 Benavídez rail disaster
 1972 Chicago commuter rail crash
 1981 Seer Green rail crash
 1990 Ursus rail crash
 2008 Chatsworth train collision
 2009 Washington Metro train collision
 2012 Buenos Aires rail disaster

To reduce the chance of telescoping, rail and tramway vehicles are often provided with an anticlimber: a horizontally ridged plate at the end of the chassis, which in a collision will engage with the anticlimber on the next car.

Gallery

See also
 Anticlimber
 Buff strength
 Crashworthiness
 EN 15227 anti-climbing

References

Railway accidents and incidents